Ray Gene Smith (November 27, 1928 – August 16, 2005) was an American football defensive back who played four seasons with the Chicago Bears of the National Football League.  He first enrolled at Cameron State Agricultural College before transferring to Midwestern State University. He attended Lawton High School in Lawton, Oklahoma.

References

External links
Just Sports Stats
Ray Gene Smith's Twitter

1928 births
2005 deaths
Players of American football from Oklahoma
American football defensive backs
Cameron Aggies football players
Midwestern State Mustangs football players
Chicago Bears players
People from Anadarko, Oklahoma